Nadine Rose Mulkerrin (born 23 June 1993) is an English actress, known for portraying the role of Cleo McQueen in the Channel 4 soap opera Hollyoaks from 2015 until 2022. For her portrayal of Cleo, she has been nominated for Best Female Dramatic Performance at the British Soap Awards three times.

Early and personal life
Nadine Rose Mulkerrin was born on 23 June 1993 in Leeds, West Yorkshire. Mulkerrin went to school at St. Mary's Catholic Comprehensive School in West Yorkshire. In 2010 and at 17 years old, she left school in pursuit of a career in acting. She attended York College and graduated in 2011, after earning a National Diploma in acting. While at York College, she auditioned for the Academy of Live and Recorded Arts, who offered her a place. However, she declined and "chose not to go down the drama school route".

Mulkerrin and her Hollyoaks co-star Rory Douglas-Speed announced their engagement in December 2018. In June 2019, they announced that they were expecting their first child, and their son was born on 15 October 2019. On 25 December 2021, Mulkerrin and Douglas-Speed announced that they were expecting their second child, and their second son was born on 24 May 2022.

Career
Mulkerrin made her television debut in an episode of the ITV medical drama The Royal, and later made guest appearances in Waterloo Road, In with the Flynns and Doctors. From 2013 to 2015, she played the role of Ashley in the BBC sitcom Still Open All Hours. Also in 2015, it was announced that Mulkerrin had been cast as series regular Cleo McQueen in the Channel 4 soap opera Hollyoaks. In 2017, Mulkerrin was nominated for Best Female Dramatic Performance at the British Soap Awards for her portrayal of Cleo.  She was then nominated in the same category at the 2018 and 2019 ceremony. Mulkerrin exited her role as Cleo in May 2022.

Filmography

Awards and nominations

References

External links
 

1993 births
21st-century English actresses
Actresses from Leeds
English film actresses
English soap opera actresses
English television actresses
English Roman Catholics
Living people
People educated at Mount St Mary's Catholic High School, Leeds